Roberto Bassaletti (born May 3, 1983) is an Argentine former footballer who played for Chilean clubs Audax Italiano (2000–2001), Huachipato (2002–2004), Deportes La Serena (2005), Deportes Puerto Montt (2005) and Santiago Wanderers (2006–2007).

References
 

1983 births
Living people
Footballers from Buenos Aires
Argentine footballers
Association football midfielders
Audax Italiano footballers
C.D. Huachipato footballers
Puerto Montt footballers
Deportes La Serena footballers
Santiago Wanderers footballers
Chilean Primera División players
Expatriate footballers in Chile
Argentine expatriate footballers